Fife is a council area and historic county in Scotland.

Fife may also refer to:
 Fife (instrument), a musical instrument similar to the piccolo

Places 
 Fife, Texas, U.S.
 Fife, Virginia, U.S.
 Fife, Washington
 Fife Lake, Saskatchewan, Canada
 Fife Lake, Michigan, U.S.

Other uses
 Fédération Internationale Féline (FIFe), a federation of cat registries
 USS Fife, a 1979 U.S. Navy ship
 Fife, the number 5 in the NATO phonetic alphabet
 Fife (cutlery), a combination utensil

People with the surname
 Allan Fife (born 1954), Australian businessman
 Austin E. and Alta S. Fife, pioneering Utah folklorists
 Catherine Fife (born 1968/1969), Canadian politician
 Connie Fife (born 1961), Cree Canadian poet and editor
 Dane Fife (born 1979), American basketball player
 Danny Fife (born 1949), American baseball player
 David Fife (1805–1877), Canadian farmer
 Dougie Fife (born 1990), Scottish rugby union player
 Fred J. Fife (born 1937), American politician and engineer
 Graeme Fife, English writer, playwright and broadcaster
 Irwin Fife (1894–1971), American inventor
 Ivy Fife (1905–1976), New Zealand painter
 James Fife, pirate active in the Caribbean
 Jason Fife (born 1981), American football player
 Jenna Fife (born 1995), Scottish footballer
 John Fife, human rights activist
 Josh Fife (born 2000), Australian racing driver
 Macduff of Fife (died 1298), played a small but significant role in the Wars of Scottish Independence
 Phyllis Fife (born 1948), American painter
 Ralph Fife (1920–2000), American football player
 Robert Fife (born 1954), Canadian journalist
 Rolf Einar Fife (born 1961), Norwegian diplomat
 Sam Fife (1926–1979), Christian leader
 Stephen Fife (born 1986), American baseball player
 Wal Fife (1929–2017), Australian politician
 William Fife (disambiguation), several

Characters
 Barney Fife, a fictional character in The Andy Griffith Show portrayed by Don Knotts

People with the given name
 Fife Symington (born 1945), American businessman and politician

See also
 Fief, a central element of feudalism
 Fife Lake Township, Michigan, U.S.
 Fifeshire (disambiguation)
 Fifer (disambiguation)
 Fyfe, a name
 Fyffe (disambiguation)
 Phyfe
 

Scottish toponymic surnames
Surnames of Lowland Scottish origin